The Dr. Hezekiah Oden House is a building and property in Franklin, Tennessee, United States, dating from c. 1850 that was listed on the National Register of Historic Places (NRHP) in 1988. It has also been known as Walnut Winds. It includes Greek Revival, Central passage plan and other architecture.

It was one of about thirty antebellum "significant brick and frame residences" built in Williamson County that have survived and that were centers of slave plantations.  It is one of several of these located "on the rich farmland surrounding Franklin";  others were Glen Echo, the Franklin Hardeman House and the Samuel Glass House, the Thomas Brown House, the Stokely Davis House, the Beverly Toon House and the Samuel S. Marten House.

References

Central-passage houses in Tennessee
Greek Revival houses in Tennessee
Houses completed in 1850
Houses in Franklin, Tennessee
Houses on the National Register of Historic Places in Tennessee
National Register of Historic Places in Williamson County, Tennessee